DXKT (103.1 FM), broadcasting as Magic 103, is a radio station owned by Westwind Broadcasting Network and operated by EMedia Productions. The station's studio is located in Brgy. Poblacion, Titay, Philippines.

On April 5, 2010, the station was bombed by riding in tandem men, leaving one injured.

References

Philippine radio networks